Jean Hazel Dalton (born 3 December 1964) is justice of the Supreme Court of Queensland in the Trial Division. She was appointed to the court in 2011.

Early life and education 
Dalton was born in Brisbane and studied at the University of Queensland, graduating with a Bachelor of Arts in 1984 and a Bachelor of Laws with first class honours in 1986, receiving the University Medal in Law.

Career
Dalton commenced her legal career as an associate to Supreme Court Justice Desmond Derrington, before becoming a clerk at Morris Fletcher & Cross. She was admitted to the bar in 1989 and had a diverse practice, covering medical negligence, commercial and corporate law. Dalton was appointed a Senior Counsel in 2004. Dalton also served as President of the Anti-Discrimination Tribunal, Deputy Chair of the Aboriginal and Torres Strait Islander Land Tribunal, and as a member of the Land Court.

Supreme Court
Dalton was appointed to the Supreme Court on 25 February 2011, the 108th judge to be appointed. Dalton has been the trial judge in a diverse range of cases,  from refusing bail for a man accused of domestic violence while awaiting trial for other allegations of domestic violence, to a commercial dispute where the administrator was removed for preferring its own commercial interests to that of the fund. Dalton was scathing of the administrators and their lawyers, finding that the administrators had been extravagant in its use of member's funds, gave misleading information to creditors and that a solicitor’s affidavit was little more than combative and querulous commentary on the litigation. Dalton also had to decide whether to order that a baby be vaccinated against hepatitis B contrary to the wishes of the parents. The mother had chronic hepatitis B and Dalton held that it was in the child's best interests to be vaccinated.

While appointed to the Trial Division, Dalton has also sat in the Court of Appeal, delivering the leading judgment in a personal injury case, finding that the judgment of the District Court was illogical and unreasonable to reject the evidence of the plaintiff.

References

Judges of the Supreme Court of Queensland
Australian women judges
Living people
1964 births
Lawyers from Brisbane
University of Queensland alumni